George Brooke, 9th Baron Cobham (29 September 1558) KG, lord of the Manor of Cobham, Kent and of Cooling Castle, Kent, was an English peer, soldier and magnate, who participated in the political turmoil following the death of King Henry VIII.

Origins
He was the eldest surviving son of Thomas Brooke, 8th Baron Cobham by his first wife Dorothy Heydon, a daughter of Sir Henry Heydon and Anne Boleyn.

His paternal grandparents were John Brooke, 7th Baron Cobham and Margaret Neville, a daughter of Edward Neville, 3rd Baron Bergavenny and Katherine Howard. His maternal grandparents were Sir Henry Heydon and Anne Boleyn, daughter of Geoffrey Boleyn and cousin to King Henry VIII's second wife and queen consort, Anne Boleyn. The 3rd Baron Bergavenny was the youngest son of Ralph Neville, 1st Earl of Westmorland and his second wife, Lady Joan Beaufort, daughter of John of Gaunt, 1st Duke of Lancaster's third marriage and half-sister of King Henry IV. Bergavenny's wife, Katherine Howard, was the daughter of Sir Robert Howard and Lady Margaret Mowbray. Katherine's brother was the first Howard Duke of Norfolk. Norfolk was an ancestor to the two wives of Henry VIII that were beheaded, Anne Boleyn and Catherine Howard.

Career
In his youth he accompanied his father to the marriage of Princess Mary (sister of King Henry VIII), to King Louis XII of France. He returned to France during the 1520s, fighting with distinction around Calais. In July 1523 after the taking of Morlaix, he was invested as a Knight by Thomas Howard, Earl of Surrey and succeeded to his father's title in November 1529. In 1536 he was one of the 27 peers at the trial of his second cousin Queen Anne Boleyn. After the Dissolution of the Monasteries he acquired much former monastic property. At home he served as a Justice of the Peace for Kent. In 1544 he occupied a high command in the English army which invaded Scotland; later that year he was appointed commanding officer of Calais, a personal possession of the king. He was made a Knight of the Garter on 24 April 1549.

Brooke's family were dogged by scandal. His sister, Elizabeth Brooke, was married to Sir Thomas Wyatt but lived openly in adultery with another man. Allegedly she attracted the attention of Henry VIII in 1542, and Eustace Chapuys, the Imperial ambassador, thought that had she tried she could have become Henry's sixth wife. His daughter, Elisabeth Brooke, Marchioness of Northampton, was also prone to scandal as from 1543 she had lived with her future husband William Parr, 1st Marquess of Northampton whilst he was separated from his wife Anne Bourchier, 7th Baroness Bourchier. They eventually married during the reign of Edward VI, but this was declared invalid by Mary I. In the reign of Elizabeth I, their marriage was finally confirmed as valid.

He resigned his post in 1550 and on 23 May became a member of the Privy Council of Edward VI. After Edward's death, Brooke supported the attempt by John Dudley, 1st Duke of Northumberland to place his daughter-in-law Lady Jane Grey on the throne. He was pardoned by Queen Mary I, but subsequently fell under suspicion again. His nephew, Sir Thomas Wyatt the younger was the leader of Wyatt's Rebellion, a Protestant rebellion which brought suspicion on the whole family. Brooke's daughter, Elizabeth Brooke, is thought to have been the instigator of the plot to place Lady Jane Grey on the throne instead of Mary I. During his Rebellion, Wyatt besieged Lord Cobham in Cooling Castle and although Cobham claimed to have resisted, following the failure of the rebellion he was accused of complicity in it and was imprisoned in the Tower of London for a brief period. The next year, at the start of the Roman Catholic Queen's formal reconciliation with the Holy See, he was assigned to welcome to England the papal legate Cardinal Pole, who went on to be responsible for many Protestant martyrdoms in England. The entertainment is recorded as having taken place at Cooling Castle in 1555. Thereafter Cobham limited himself to local affairs in Kent.

Marriage and issue

In about 1517, certainly before 1526, at Eaton Bray in Bedfordshire, he married Anne Braye (b.1501), eldest daughter and co-heiress of Edmund Braye, 1st Baron Braye (c.1480–1539), of Eaton Bray, by his heiress wife Jane Halliwell (c.1480–1558). By his wife he had issue ten sons and four daughters:

Sons
William Brooke, 10th Baron Cobham (1 November 1527 – 6 March 1597), eldest son and heir, who married firstly, Dorothy Nevill, by whom he had one daughter, and secondly in 1560, Frances Newton, a Lady of the Bedchamber to Queen Elizabeth I, by whom he had seven children.
George Brooke (27 January 1533 – 1570), who married Christiana Duke, only daughter and sole heiress (of his unsettled lands) of Richard Duke (c.1515–1572), MP, of Otterton, Devon, by whom he had issue:
Duke Brooke;
Peter Brooke;
Thomas Brooke (1533 – 1578), alias "Thomas Cobham", MP, married and had issue.
 John Brooke (22 April 1535 – 1594), alias "John Cobham", who before 1561 married Lady Alice Norton (alias Cobbe), widow of Sir John Norton of Northwood, Milton, Kent, without issue.
Sir Henry Brooke (5 February 1537 or 1538 – c. 1591 or January 1592), who married Anne Sutton (d. circa January 1611 or 1612), a daughter of Sir Henry Sutton of Nottinghamshire, by whom he had issue:
John Brooke, 1st Baron Cobham;
Philippa Brooke (d. c. September 1613, buried at Stockeston, Leicestershire, on 28 September 1613), wife successively of Walter Calverley and Sir Thomas Burton, 1st Baronet;
Ann Brooke, wife of Edward Heron.

Daughters
Dorothy Brooke (b. 1518);
Elisabeth Brooke (25 June 1526 – 2 April 1565), who married (bigamously, as his second wife) William Parr, 1st Marquess of Northampton (only brother of Queen Katherine Parr, last of the six wives of king Henry VIII), while he was deemed still wedded to Anne Bourchier, 7th Baroness Bourchier, having obtained a legally incomplete divorce. Without issue. Having unsuccessfully consulted doctors in Antwerp, she died of breast cancer at the Blackfriars and was buried in nearby St Paul's Cathedral in the City of London;
 Catherine Brooke (b. c. 1527), who married John Jerningham, by whom she had issue.

Death and burial
He died on 29 September 1558, closely followed by his wife, Anne Bray, and was buried in the chancel of St Mary Magdalene's Church, Cobham. His inquisition post mortem was held on 20 January 1559 and his will, dated 13 January 1557/1558, was proved on 6 December 1560. He was succeeded by his eldest son, William Brooke, 10th Baron Cobham.

References

1490s births
1558 deaths
Knights of the Garter
George
16th-century English nobility
9